Anders Poulsen may refer to:
 Anders Poulsen (ice hockey)
 Anders Poulsen (referee)
 Anders Poulsen (shaman)